George Herrick Worker (born 23 August 1989) is a New Zealand international cricketer. He was named in New Zealand's squad for their tour to Zimbabwe in August 2015, after Mitchell Santner was ruled out due to injury. He made his Twenty20 International debut for New Zealand on 9 August 2015. He made his One Day International debut for New Zealand against South Africa on 23 August 2015.

Domestic and franchise career
He made his first class debut scoring 71 runs opening the batting for Central Districts in December 2007. He captained the Palmerston North Boys High School, the same school Jacob Oram had attended, first eleven for two years. He has represented the Central Districts Under 19 side.  He skippered the New Zealand Under-19s, featured in the ICC Under-19 World Cup in Malaysia then toured England in 2008.

A genuine all-rounder who bats in the top order and bowls left-arm spin, Worker made his first-class debut for Central Districts in December 2007, hitting 71 on debut. He played over 80 matches across all three formats for the Stags, including the 2010 Champions League tournament in South Africa, before switching to the Canterbury Wizards for the 2011/12 season, where he has recently posted his maiden first-class hundred (120*) against Auckland Aces.

In 2010/11 Worker enjoyed his best season on the domestic circuit in all formats. He hit 335 runs at 30.45, with three fifties in the first-class arena, then an impressive 307 runs at 51.16 including his maiden hundred in domestic cricket. In the T20 format, 207 runs at 25.87 and 4 wickets at 10, with an economy rate of 5.71 pushed his name forward for international consideration.

Worker, has not only played Under-19 cricket for New Zealand, but featured for the national Emerging Players side against the touring England Lions in 2009. Later that year, he was part of the same side that played in the Cricket Australia Emerging Players Tournament in Brisbane.

He has also just returned from a success stint abroad, where he played league cricket in Scotland for SMRH which culminated in playing in the CB40 competition for Scotland. He was the sides leading run-scorer in two of his three fixtures.

In the 2016–17 Ford Trophy, Worker scored the most runs in the tournament, with 659 in ten matches.

He has been called up to replace Neil Broom for the final 2 T20I matches against Bangladesh on 5 January 2017, but will be released to play for Central District for the Domestic T20 Final on 7 January if he is not selected to play the day before, which he was released when it was announced he was replaced by Jimmy Neesham.

On 3 June 2018, he was selected to play for the Montreal Tigers in the players' draft for the inaugural edition of the Global T20 Canada tournament.

In October 2020, in the second round of the 2020–21 Plunket Shield season, Worker played in his 100th first-class match. In January 2021, in the 2020–21 Super Smash, Worker scored his first century in T20 cricket.

International career
Worker was named in 12-men New Zealand's squad for their tour to Zimbabwe in August 2015, after Mitchell Santner was ruled out due to injury. His first international appearance came during the single Twenty20 International on 9 August 2015. He top scored in the match with 62 runs off 38 balls with 4 sixes and 3 fours. New Zealand easily won the match and Worker was the man of the match.

In November 2017, he was added to New Zealand's Test squad for their series against the West Indies.

In May 2018, he was one of twenty players to be awarded a new contract for the 2018–19 season by New Zealand Cricket.

References

External links

 

1989 births
Living people
New Zealand cricketers
New Zealand One Day International cricketers
New Zealand Twenty20 International cricketers
Canterbury cricketers
Central Districts cricketers
People educated at Palmerston North Boys' High School
North Island cricketers
Jamaica Tallawahs cricketers
Scotland cricketers